Zorino is a rural locality (a selo) in Kamyshovsky Selsoviet, Limansky District, Astrakhan Oblast, Russia. The population was 35 as of 2010. There are 2 streets.

Geography 
Zorino is located 53 km northeast of Liman (the district's administrative centre) by road. Yar-Bazar is the nearest rural locality.

References 

Rural localities in Limansky District